The 2019–20 season will be Balatonfüredi KSE's 13th competitive and consecutive season in the Nemzeti Bajnokság I and 29th year in existence as a handball club.

Players

Squad information

Goalkeepers
 1  Nándor Fazekas
 12  Dániel Bősz
 21  Adrián Andó
Left Wingers
 7  Bendegúz Bóka
 30  Bálint Ág
Right Wingers
 8  Bence Déber
 26  Pedro Rodríguez
Line players
 3  László Kemény
 19  Darko Stevanović
 22  Petar Topić

Left Backs
 6  Márton Varga
 16  Barnabás Orbán
 28  Aliaksei Shynkel
 92  Bence Zdolik
Central Backs
 10  Balázs Németh
 14  Balázs Szöllősi
Right Backs
 11  Luis Felipe Jiménez
 91  Péter Határ
 99  Dominik Máthé

Transfers
Source:  hetmeteres.hu

 In:
 Luis Felipe Jiménez (from  Olympiacos)
 Pedro Rodríguez (from Szeged)
 Darko Stevanović (from  Partizan)
 Aliaksei Shynkel (from  Motor Zaporozhye)

 Out:
 Uelington Ferreira (to  Saran Loiret)
 Péter Hornyák (to Balatonfüred)
 Ottó Kancel (to Orosháza)
 Alex Németh (to Vác)
 Yury Semenov (to  Riihimäki Cocks)
 Zoltán Szita  (loan to Veszprém)
 Olivér Szőlősi  (to Mezőkövesd)

Club

Technical Staff

Source: Coaches

Uniform
Supplier: Erima
Main sponsor: tippmix / Sennebogen / 77 Elektronika / Takarékbank / City of Balatonfüred / Volkswagen
Back sponsor: Oriens
Shorts sponsor: Bradimpex Kft

Competitions

Overview

Nemzeti Bajnokság I

Results by round

Matches

Results overview

Hungarian Cup

Matches

Cancelled due to the COVID-19 pandemic.

EHF Cup

Third qualifying round

Balatonfüredi KSE lost, 51–56 on aggregate.

Statistics

Top scorers
Includes all competitive matches. The list is sorted by shirt number when total goals are equal.
Last updated on 31 January 2020

Attendances
List of the home matches:

References

External links
 
 Balatonfüredi KSE at eurohandball.com

 
Balatonfüredi KSE